That Uncertain Feeling may refer to:

That Uncertain Feeling (film), a 1941 American comedy directed by Ernst Lubitsch
That Uncertain Feeling (novel), a 1955 novel by Kingsley Amis
 That Uncertain Feeling (TV series), a 1986 British television adaptation of the novel